The Volvo Ocean 65 class yacht Abu Dhabi Ocean Racing was built for the 2014–15 Volvo Ocean Race. Following this, the boat was refitted and renamed for the 2017–18 Volvo Ocean Race where it competed as Sun Hung Kai/Scallywag. For the 2023 The Ocean Race she was renamed again to Viva México.

Abu Dhabi Ocean Racing

2014–2015 Volvo Ocean Race
Skippered by British Olympic medalist Ian Walker the boat won the overall race.

Sun Hung Kai/Scallywag

2017–2018 Volvo Ocean Race
The crew consisted of:
 (skipper)
Alex Gough

António Fontes

At approximately 13:42 UTC on March 26, 2018, some 1400 nm west of Cape Horn, the team's safety officer John Fisher was knocked overboard when the boat experienced a sudden chinese gybe.  It took the team 10 minutes to resolve it. John was knocked overboard by the mainsheet. His teammates' search for him in the harsh conditions of the Southern Ocean was suspended after four hours. He was declared lost at sea. The death of Fisher greatly impacted the rest of the fleet, in particular his skipper, who hadn't sailed without him in 12 years. Fisher's loss was the first tragedy seen by the Ocean Race since Hans Horrevoets' death in the 2005–06 edition.

Viva México

2023 The Ocean Race
The crew consisted of:
 Erik Brockmann (skipper)
 Jaime Arbones
 Carlos Bermúdez
 Roberto Bermúdez
 Annemieke Bes
 Tania Elías Calles
 Dominique Knüppel
 Juan Luís Medina
 Juan Varela

References

2010s sailing yachts
Sailing yachts built in the United Kingdom
Sailing yachts designed by Farr Yacht Design
Volvo Ocean Race yachts
Volvo Ocean 65 yachts
Sailing yachts of the United Arab Emirates